The 2017–18 OK Liga is the 49th season of the top-tier league of rink hockey in Spain. It will start on 7 October 2017 and will finish on 27 May 2018.

Teams

League table

Results

Top goalscorers
Raül Marín beat the record of goals in a season with 58.

Copa del Rey

The 2018 Copa del Rey was the 75th edition of the Spanish men's roller-hockey cup. The tournament was hosted in Lloret de Mar.

The first seven qualified teams after the end of the first half of the season and Lloret Vila Esportiva as home team will play the Cup. Barcelona Lassa defended successfully its title, by defeating 2–1 Liceo in the final.

Qualified teams

Bracket

Source: FEP.es

Supercopa de España

The 2017 Supercopa de España was the 14th edition of the Spanish men's roller hockey supercup.

It was played in a Final Four format between Voltregà, who qualified as host team, Barcelona Lassa as league and cup champion, and Reus Deportiu and Liceo as second and third qualified of the previous season.

Barcelona Lassa achieved their tenth title in a tournament where Liceo was the defending champion.

See also
2017–18 OK Liga Femenina

References

External links
Real Federación Española de Patinaje

OK Liga seasons
2017 in roller hockey
2018 in roller hockey
2017 in Spanish sport
2018 in Spanish sport